The Juans (stylized in lowercase) is a Filipino pop rock band based in Bulacan, Philippines. It currently consists of lead vocalist and keyboardist Carl Guevarra, vocalist and lead guitarist Japs Mendoza, vocalist and bassist Chael Adriano, and vocalist and acoustic guitarist RJ Cruz.

History
The Juans was initially categorized as a boy band, but the management team decided to recategorize them as a conventional band. Jiad Arroyo was a founding member, along with Daniel Grospe. Carl Guevarra, Jason de Mesa, and Japs Mendoza joined later.

The band was initially named at a coffee shop shortly after a One Direction concert, where the boys were mulling the British boy band's popularity. They were initially called the D’ Juans, after Juan De La Cruz.

In 2018, The Juans announced the departure of three members, Jiad Arroyo, Jason De Mesa, and Daniel Grospe, as their contract with Viva Records is about to expire.

Before they depart, the band, along with Viva Records, created a miniseries called "We Are The Juans". They had recorded the EP, "Umaga", before the three members left the band. Not so long after, The Juans introduced their new members, RJ Cruz, Chael Adriano, and Joshua Coronel.

On March 18, 2021, the group debuted on Billboard's LyricFind Global charts. They released the single "Dulo" in October 2021.

Their March 2022 album LIWANAG was their first effort with more than two members contributing songs. The album, according to the band, took over a year to complete.

By June 2022, the band announced the departure of drummer Joshua Coronel citing personal reasons.

It was revealed in October 2022 they were recording the theme song for the ABS-CBN series Tara, G!.

Band members

Current members
 Carl Guevarra (lead vocals, keyboards) - (2013–present)
 Japs Mendoza (vocals, lead guitar) - (2013–present)
 Chael Adriano (vocals, Bass guitar) - (2018–present)
 RJ Cruz (vocals, acoustic guitar) - (2018–present)

Former members
 Jiad Arroyo (vocals, lead guitar)
 Jason De Mesa (vocals, bass guitar) (2013-2018)
Daniel Grospe (vocals, drums) (2013-2018)
 Joshua Coronel (drums) (2018-2022)

Discography

Extended plays

Album

Singles

Chart performance

Filmography

Music videos

Awards and nominations

References 

2013 establishments in the Philippines
Filipino pop music groups
Musical groups established in 2013
Musical groups from Metro Manila
Viva Records (Philippines) artists